Jalan Ulu Cheka (Pahang state route C141) is a major road in Pahang, Malaysia. The roads served as a bypass of Jerantut town.

List of junctions

Roads in Pahang